The 2018 European Youth Weightlifting Championships took place in Crowne Plaza Milan - Linate, San Donato Milanese, Italy from 22 to 29 July 2018.

Medal overview

Under-15

Boys

Girls

Youth (Under-17)

Boys

Girls

Medal table
Ranking by Big (Total result) medals
 

Ranking by all medals: Big (Total result) and Small (Snatch and Clean & Jerk)

References

External links 
Under 15 results book
Youth results book

European Youth Championships,2018
International sports competitions hosted by Italy
Sports competitions in Milan
European Youth Championships
2018 in Italian sport
Weightlifting Championships,European
July 2018 sports events in Europe
Youth Championships,2018